OG Mailinglist (Organic Groups Mailing List) is a module that turns Drupal into a listserv, allowing it to run multiple electronic mailing lists.
OG Mailinglist is coded primarily in PHP and requires the Organic Groups modules as well as Phpmailer to run.  It is currently maintained by Kyle Mathews and Mattias Põldaru. OG Mailinglist is free software, subject to the requirement of the GNU General Public License.  It works with Unix style mail servers such as Postfix, Exim and qmail. It also can interface with Mailgun from Rackspace.

Features include:
 A Web browser interface for list administration, archiving of messages.
 A customizable home page for each mailing list.
 Support for virtual domains.
 Web based subscribing and unsubscribing. Users can temporarily disable their accounts, select email digest modes, hide their email addresses from other members, etc.
 Mailing list archiver utilizing Drupal's built in content types or forums.

See also 

 List of mailing list software
 Electronic mailing list
 Mailing list

References

Further reading

Other resources 
 How OG Mailinglist Works
 Youtube Video explaining how to set up OG Mailinglist
 DruaplModules.com rating for OG Mailinglist
 One step closer to bringing email discussion lists (listserv) to Kabissa Groups

Free software programmed in PHP
Free mailing list software
Mailing list software for Linux
Drupal